Salim Diakite (born 3 June 2000) is a French professional footballer who plays as a defender for Ternana.

Career

In 2018, Diakite joined the youth academy of Portuguese top flight side Rio Ave.

In 2019, he signed for Olympia Agnonese in the Italian fourth division from French fourth division club Mantois.

In 2020, he signed for Teramo in the Italian third division.

In 2021, he joined Serie B side Ternana.

Personal life
Born in France, he is of Malian descent.

References

External links

 

Living people
French footballers
Association football defenders
2000 births
Expatriate footballers in Italy
Serie C players
FC Mantois 78 players
Pol. Olympia Agnonese players
Serie D players
S.S. Teramo Calcio players
Ternana Calcio players
Footballers from Yvelines
French people of Malian descent